Jeremiah Smith may refer to:

Jeremiah Smith (Royal Navy officer) (died 1675), English naval officer
Jeremiah Smith (clergyman) (died 1723), English author and theologian
Jeremiah Smith (lawyer) (1759–1842), American jurist and state governor
Jeremiah Smith (Manchester Grammar School) (1771–1854), English cleric and headmaster
Jeremiah Smith, fictional character in The X-Files

See also
Jeremiah Smith Boies De Veber (1830–1908), Canadian politician and businessman
Jeremiah Smith Grange #161, listed in the New Hampshire State Register of Historic Places
Jerry Smith (disambiguation)